The Pella Square (Macedonian: Плоштад Пела, Ploštad Pela) is one of the main squares of Skopje, the capital city of North Macedonia.

It is located in Centar Municipality, near the city's main square, Macedonia Square. The square is named after the city Pella, located in the current Pella regional unit of Central Macedonia in Greece, the capital of the ancient Macedonian kingdom and birthplace of both Krste Misirkov and Alexander the Great. A statue of Krste Misirkov was unveiled at Pella Square in 2007. It commonly serves as the site of music concerts, political speeches, demonstrations or other gatherings.

References

Squares in Skopje